William Reid Clanny FRSE (1776 – 10 January 1850) was an Irish physician and inventor of a safety lamp.

Life
Clanny was born in Bangor, County Down, Kingdom of Ireland. He trained as a physician at Edinburgh, and served as an assistant surgeon in the Royal Navy. He was present at the Battle of Copenhagen in 1801. He left the Navy and graduated in 1803 before settling for a while in Durham. He moved to Bishopwearmouth, near Sunderland, England and practised there for 45 years.

While in Durham, on 4th February, 1806, he was initiated into Freemasonry at the Marquis of Granby Lodge. Then after moving to Sunderland, he joined The Sea Captain's Lodge, later to be renamed Palatine Lodge No 97. 

He was elected a Fellow of the Royal Society of Edinburgh in 1825, his proposers being Sir George Ballingall, Robert Kaye Greville, and Sir William Newbigging.

Clanny died on 10 January 1850 and was buried at Galleys Gill Cemetery in Sunderland. The entry in the Dictionary of National Biography states "his claim to remembrance rests on his efforts to diminish the loss of life from explosions in collieries.

Safety lamps
In 1812 the Felling mine disaster and later in the year the explosion at Mill Pit in Herrington near Sunderland concentrated minds on the problems of underground lighting.

In the same year Clanny completed his first lamp consisting of a candle in a glass surround. Below the glass was a trough containing water through which air was forced by a pair of bellows. Fumes bubbled out through another water chamber above. A paper 'On the Means of procuring a Steady Light in Coal Mines without the Danger of Explosion' was read before the Royal Society on 20 May the following year.

Early machines were quite cumbersome. But Clanny later succeeded in reducing the weight of the lamp to 34 ounces (964 grams).

By 1816, when Clanny published Practical observations on safety lamps for coal mines, he had experimented in person with a safety lamp at the Mill Pit in Herrington near Sunderland, where there had been a serious explosive accident, with the loss of 24 lives, on 10 October 1812. Clanny won medals in 1816–17 for his invention from the Royal Society of Arts.

His lamp and other improvements were, after some initial disputes, recognised for their true worth by his contemporaries, including northern coal owners who presented him with a purse of gold. with a silver salver at the Athenæum, Sunderland, on 3 February 1848.

George Stephenson acknowledged a debt to Clanny's researches and Humphry Davy invented his version of a lamp very soon after a visit to Sunderland in August 1815.

References
Footnotes

Citations

Bibliography

 
 
 
 
 
 
 

1776 births
1850 deaths
People from Bangor, County Down
British inventors
Irish military doctors
Mine safety
Irish general practitioners